Daniil Medvedev defeated Jannik Sinner in the final, 5–7, 6–2, 6–2 to win the singles tennis title at the 2023 Rotterdam Open.

Félix Auger-Aliassime was the defending champion, but lost in the quarterfinals to Medvedev.

Seeds

Draw

Finals

Top half

Bottom half

Qualifying

Seeds

Qualifiers

Lucky loser

Qualifying draw

First qualifier

Second qualifier

Third qualifier

Fourth qualifier

References

External links
 Main draw
 Qualifying draw

2023 ATP Tour